Jessica Cronje (born 25 January 1998) is a 4.0 point Australian wheelchair basketball player. She has been selected to represent Australia at the 2020 Summer Paralympics in Tokyo.

Biography
Jessica Cronje was born on 25 January 1998. She has cerebral palsy. She attended Camden High School and in 2020 lives in Menangle, New South Wales.

Career 
A 4.0 point forward. She was a member of the Australian team that won the silver medal at the 2015 Women's U25 Wheelchair Basketball World Championship. In 2020, the AMP Foundation's Tomorrow Fund awarded her $10,000 to help buy a custom-built sports wheelchair that she aimed to use at the 2020 Paralympics in Tokyo.

Besides wheelchair basketball, she is classified as a T37 track and field athlete. In 2015,  she was named the Athlete of the Year by the South West Sydney Academy of Sports.

References

External links
 Basketball Australia Profile
 AMP Tomorrow Maker Jessica Cronje YouTube

Australian women's wheelchair basketball players
Wheelchair basketball players at the 2020 Summer Paralympics
Living people
1998 births
Paralympic wheelchair basketball players of Australia